Wazirganj (Hindi: वज़ीरगंज,) is a town and a nagar panchayat in Budaun District in the Indian state of Uttar Pradesh.

Geography
Wazirganj is a historical place from time of *Alha, Udal*
This is the oldest temple of Khere Wali Maiya, where Alha and Udal had arrived.
It has an average elevation of 174 metres (570 feet).

Demographics
 India census, Wazirganj had a population of 17,452. Males constitute 54% of the population and females 46%. Wazirganj has an average literacy rate of 42%, lower than the national average of 59.5%: male literacy is 51%, and female literacy is 32%. In Wazirganj, 19% of the population is under 6 years of age.

References

Cities and towns in Budaun district